François-Joseph-Michel Noël (12 January 1756, Saint-Germain-en-Laye - 29 January 1841, Paris) was a French humanist and diplomat.

Life 
A student then a professor at the collège Louis-le-Grand, Noël left his job at the outbreak of the French Revolution, collaborating on the journal la Chronique and going on several diplomatic missions; in 1795/96 to the Batavian Republic.

Named a member of the Tribunat, he left it to go to Lyon to fill the role of commissar-general of police.  In 1801, he was made préfet of the Haut-Rhin and, in 1802, inspector general of public education.

Works 
His very numerous works were in large part compilations of his views on university education.

Noël wrote, with, J.-M.-J. de La Place : Conciones poeticæ, ou Discours choisis des poètes latins anciens (Paris, 1803, in-12) ; Leçons françaises de littérature et de morale (1801., 2 vol. in-8°), a frequently-reprinted anthology long used in all collèges ; Leçons latines anciennes (1808, 2 vol. in-8°) ; Leçons latines modernes (1818, 2 vol. in-8°) ; Leçons grecques (1825, 2 vol. in-8°).

With Charles-Pierre Chapsal, he prepared : Nouvelle grammaire française (Paris, 1823, 2 vol. in-12), which became a classic and remained in usage despite well-founded criticisms of it for imposing arbitrary and contradictory rules on the spirit of the French language and on good authors' usage of it ; Nouveau dictionnaire de la langue française (1826 ; in-12).

Also by Noël, with various collaborators : Dictionnaire étymologique, critique, historique, anecdotique et littéraire... pour servir à l’histoire de la langue française, 1839, avec M. L.-J. Carpentier (Paris, Le Normant, 1839) ; le Nouveau siècle de Louis XIV (Paris, 1793, 1 vol. in-8), anthology of satirical chansons and verse on Louis XIV and his court ; Éphémérides politiques, littéraires et religieuses (Paris, 1796–1797, 4. vol. in-8°) ; Dictionnaire de la Fable (Paris, 1801, 2 vol. in-8°) ; Dictionnarium Latino-gallicum (Paris, 1807, in-8°) ; Nouveau dictionnaire, français Latin (Paris, 1808, in-8°) ; Gradus ad Parnassum (Paris, 1810, in-8°) ; Philologie française ou Dictionnaire étymologique, critique, historique, etc. (Paris, 1831, 2 vol. in-8°) ; Nouveau dictionnaire des origines, inventions et découvertes (Paris, 1827, 2 vol. in-8°), etc.

Noël translated Catullus and Gallus (1803, 2 vol. in-8°), and (with Dureau de La Malle's son) completed the translation of Livy by Dureau de La Malle (1810–1824, 17 vol. in-8°).  He also revised the translations of Virgil and Horace by Binet.

He also translated several English works into French, and edited various authors.

Sources 
 Gustave Vapereau, Dictionnaire universel des littératures, Paris, Hachette, 1876, p. 1498

External links 
 His works on Gallica

1756 births
1841 deaths
French translators
French philologists
Grammarians from France
French male non-fiction writers